Ava Acres (born May 13, 2004) is an American actress. She played young Regina in Once Upon a Time and also appears in Agents of S.H.I.E.L.D. as Katya Belyakov, the main antagonist of the episode "Melinda". In addition, she has played Madeline in season 5 of the television series American Horror Story, and young Rebecca in the comedy series Crazy Ex-Girlfriend. Acres' older sister, Isabella, is also an actress.

Filmography

Film: voice roles

Film: live-action

Television: voice roles

Television: live-action

Video games

References

External links

2004 births
Living people
American child actresses
American film actresses
American television actresses
American voice actresses
21st-century American actresses
Actresses from Atlanta